Floyd K. Whittemore (October 2, 1844 – March 4, 1907) was an American politician and businessman.

Born in Auburn, New York, Whittemore and his family moved to Sycamore, Illinois in 1848. He went to the Sycamore public schools. Whittemore worked for the DeKalb County, Illinois circuit clerk office. He was also a farmer. He worked as the cashier for the State National Bank of Springfield. He was assistant treasurer of the United States at Chicago, Illinois. In 1895, Whittemore was appointed assistant Illinois state treasurer. From 1899 to 1901, Whittemore served as Illinois state treasurer and was a Republican. Whittemore died at his home in Springfield, Illinois.

Notes

1844 births
1907 deaths
People from Sycamore, Illinois
Politicians from Auburn, New York
Businesspeople from Illinois
Farmers from Illinois
Illinois Republicans
State treasurers of Illinois